Allan Furlong (born January 26, 1942) is a former politician in Ontario, Canada. He was a Liberal member of the Legislative Assembly of Ontario from 1987 to 1990 who represented the riding of Durham Centre.

Background
Furlong was educated at the University of New Brunswick, and was called to the Bar of New Brunswick in 1971. He worked as a lawyer before entering politics, and was a member of the firm Salmers and Furlong. He was also appointed acting small claims court judge in the judicial district of Durham, Ontario for bilingual trials.

Politics
Furlong was elected to the Ontario legislature in the 1987 provincial election defeating his New Democratic Party opponent by 3,004 votes in the riding of Durham Centre.  He served as a backbench supporter of David Peterson's government for the next three years.

The Liberals were defeated by the NDP in the 1990 provincial election, and Furlong lost his seat to NDP candidate Drummond White by 2,348 votes.  He attempted to return to the legislature in the 1995 provincial election, but lost to Progressive Conservative candidate Jim Flaherty by over 15,000 votes amid a Progressive Conservative majority government victory.

Furlong endorsed Dalton McGuinty's bid to lead the Ontario Liberal Party in 1996.

Later life
Furlong worked as the Executive Assistant to federal Liberal Member of Parliament Judi Longfield until she was defeated in January 2006 by Jim Flaherty.  Coincidentally, Longfield once held the same position for Furlong.

References

External links

1942 births
Living people
Ontario Liberal Party MPPs
People from Rouyn-Noranda